Country 105 may refer to one of the following country music stations:

 CFDC-FM, a Canadian station owned by Bayshore Broadcasting serving Shelburne, Ontario
 CKRY-FM, a Canadian station owned by Corus Entertainment serving Calgary, Alberta